Václav Havel Airport Prague, formerly Prague Ruzyně International Airport , is the international airport of Prague, the capital of the Czech Republic. The airport was founded in 1937, when it replaced the Kbely Airport (founded in 1918). It was reconstructed and extended in 1956, 1968, 1997, and 2006. In 2012, it was renamed after the last president of Czechoslovakia and the first president of the Czech Republic, Václav Havel.

In 2018 it served around 17 million passengers. It serves as a hub for Czech Airlines and Smartwings, and as a base for Ryanair and Eurowings.

History

Prague–Ruzyně Airport began operations on 5 April 1937, but Czechoslovak civil aviation history started at the military airport in Prague–Kbely in 1919. The Prague Aviation Museum is now found at Kbely Airport.

Due to insufficient capacity of Kbely Airport by the mid-1930s, the government decided to develop a new state civil airport in Ruzyně.  One of the major awards Prague Ruzyně Airport received include Diploma and Gold Medal granted in 1937 at the occasion of the International Art and Technical Exhibition in Paris  (Exposition Internationale des Arts et Techniques dans la Vie Moderne also known as Paris 1937 World's Fair) for the technical conception of the central airport, primarily the architecture of the check-in building (nowadays known as Terminal 4) designed by architect Adolf Benš.

In one of the most dramatic moments in its history, the airport was seized by Soviet paratroopers on the night of 20–21 August 1968, who then facilitated the landing of Soviet troops and transports for the invasion of Czechoslovakia.

Moreover, the Ruzyně fields provide opportunities for further expansion of the airport according to the increasing capacity demand. The airport serves as a hub of the trans-European airport network.

Political and economic changes have significantly influenced Prague–Ruzyně Airport's seventy-year history. Some new air transportation companies and institutions were founded and some ceased operation since then. Ten entities have been responsible for airport administration over time, including the new construction and development. Until the 1990s, there were two or three-decade gaps before the major modernisation of Prague–Ruzyně Airport began to match the current capacity requirements. 

The airport stood in for Miami International Airport in the 2006 James Bond film Casino Royale.

An online petition organised by one of the best-known Slovak film directors, Fero Fenič, calling on the government and the Parliament to rename Prague Ruzyně Airport to Václav Havel International Airport attracted – in just one week after 20 December 2011—the support of over 65,000 signatories both within and outside the Czech Republic. A rendition of the airport with the proposed Václav Havel name in the form of his signature followed by his typical heart symbol suffix was included in the blog's article in support of renaming of the airport. This name change took place on 5 October 2012 on what would have been Havel's 76th birthday. The PRG name of the airport for IATA and ICAO will remain the same.

Further development

As the capacity of the airport has been reaching its limit for the last couple of years (as of 2005), further development of the airport is being considered. Besides regular repairs of the existing runways, Prague Airport began the preparations for building a new runway, parallel to the 06/24 runway. The construction with estimated costs of CZK 5–7 billion was scheduled to begin in 2007, and the new runway marked 06R/24L (also called the BIS runway) was to be put into service in 2010. Because of many legal problems and the protests of people who live close to the airport premises, however, the construction has not yet begun. Despite these problems, the project has support from the government, and is expected to be completed by the end of 2014.

Prague Airport states that besides increasing the airport capacity, the new runway system will greatly reduce the noise level in some densely inhabited areas of Prague. This should be achieved by reorganising the air traffic space around the airport, and shifting the traffic corridors after putting the two parallel runways into service. The vision of heavy traffic raised many protests from the suburban communities directly surrounding the airport. On 6 November 2004, local referendums were held in two Prague suburbs – Nebušice and Přední Kopanina – giving official support to the local authorities for active opposition against the construction of the parallel runway.

The construction of a railway connection between the airport and Prague city centre is also in the planning stage. The track will be served by express trains with special fares, connecting non-stop the airport with the city centre, and local trains fully integrated into Prague integrated transit system.

General runway reconstruction 
The main runway 06/24 was reconstructed from 2012 - 2013 due to poor technical conditions. During reconstruction, runway 12/30 was the only usable runway as runway 04/22 is closed permanently. The runway reconstruction was originally planned for three stages. The first stage in 2012, the second stage in 2013 and the last stage in 2014. Runway 12/30 (which would be used during the reconstruction of the main runway) is not equipped for low visibility landings as it offers only ILS CAT I landings. In addition, the approach path of runway 12/30 goes above high-density population areas (such as Prague 6 and Kladno). Therefore, the second and the third stage of the runway reconstruction had to be merged so the works could be finished in 2013.

Infrastructure

Terminals
Prague Airport has two main passenger terminals, two general aviation terminals, as well as a cargo facility. Most flights depart Prague Airport from the North Terminals (Terminal 1 and 2). The South Terminals (Terminal 3 and 4) handle a few irregular flights, as well as VIP flights, special flights and small aircraft.

 Terminal 1 is used for flights outside the Schengen Area; it was opened in 1968 and rebuilt in 1997, it includes concourses A and B
 Terminal 2 is used for flights within the Schengen area; it was opened on 17 January 2006, it includes concourses C and D
 Terminal 3 is used for private and charter flights; it was opened in 1997
 Terminal 4 is used exclusively for VIP flights and state visits; it is the oldest part of the airport, and was opened on 5 April 1937.

There are also two freight terminals, Cargo Terminal 1 is operated by Menzies Aviation Czech while Cargo Terminal 2 is operated by Skyport.

Runways
The airport contains two runways in service: 06/24 (till April 1993 07/25) and 12/30 (till May 2012 13/31). Former runway 04/22 is permanently closed for take-offs and landings and is used for taxiing and parking only. The most used runway is 24 due to the prevailing western winds. Runway 30 is also used often. Runway 06 is used rarely, while runway 12 is used only exceptionally.

Operations
The company operating the airport is Prague Airport (Letiště Praha, a. s.), a joint-stock company that has one shareholder, the Ministry of Finance. The company was founded in February 2008, as part of a privatisation process involving the Airport Prague (Správa Letiště Praha, s.p.) state enterprise. This action was in accordance with the Czech Republic Government Memorandum Nr. 888, which had been passed on 9 July 2008. On 1 December 2008, Prague Airport took all rights and duties formerly held by Správa Letiště Praha, s.p., and Prague Airports took all business authorisations, certificates, employees, and licenses from the former company. The head office of Prague Airport is in Prague 6. The former state-owned enterprise had its head office on the airport property.

Airlines and destinations

Passenger
The following airlines operate regular scheduled and charter flights at Prague Airport:

Cargo

Statistics

Annual passenger numbers

It was the 35th busiest airport in Europe in 2019 and the second busiest (after Warsaw Chopin Airport) in the newer EU member states.

Busiest routes 
The top 15 destinations by passengers handled in 2019 were:

Other facilities

Czech Airlines has its head office, the APC Building, on the grounds of Prague Airport. On 30 December 2009 CSA announced that it will sell its head office to the airport for CZK 607 million. Smartwings have their head office on the airport property. In addition the Civil Aviation Authority also has its head office on the airport property.

Ground transportation
Buses of DPP, the Prague Public Transit Co., stop at both terminals 1 and 2 frequently. A Czech Railways public bus service, AE – AirportExpress, connects Terminal 1 with Praha hlavní nádraží. From bus station in front of Terminal 1 there are also regular buses to Kladno, intercity buses of Regiojet run every 30–60 minutes to Karlovy Vary and Cheb.

There are plans to build a rail connection to the airport. Preliminary work commenced in 2018, with procurement proceedings launched the following year. Main construction is likely to start around 2023, and completion is (as of summer 2022) expected to be 2029.

According to a 2021 media report, the airport is to be served via a branch off the Prague-Kladno line, including an underground station to serve the airport. The project also includes double tracking and electrifying the existing single-track railway. The plan also includes upgrades to Prague-Masarykovo station

Accidents and incidents
 On 19 February 1973, Aeroflot Flight 141, during approach a Tupolev Tu-154 crashed half a kilometre short of the airport. While most of the passengers survived the crash many died in the fire that followed. Altogether 66 people died from the 100 passengers and crew. The crash was the first loss of and the first fatal accident involving a Tu-154. 
 On 30 October 1975, Inex-Adria Aviopromet Flight 450, a Douglas DC-9-32 hit high ground during an approach in fog to Prague Ruzyně Airport. 75 of the 120 passengers and crew on board were killed.
 On 29 March 1989, two teenagers from Czechoslovakia armed with grenades and shotguns hijacked Malév Flight 640 at Prague Ruzyně Airport, and forced the Tupolev Tu-154B with 15 hostages to fly to Frankfurt Airport in West Germany before surrendering.

See also
 List of airports in the Czech Republic

Notes

References

External links

 Official website
 Prague airport information
 
 

Transport in Prague
Buildings and structures in Prague
Tourism in Prague
Airports in the Czech Republic
Airports established in 1937
Airfields of the United States Army Air Forces Air Transport Command in the European Theater
1937 establishments in Czechoslovakia
Prague 6
International airports in the Czech Republic
20th-century architecture in the Czech Republic